Platypterocarpus is a genus of plants in the family Celastraceae. It contains a single species, Platypterocarpus tanganyikensis , endemic to Tanzania.

References

Celastraceae
Celastrales genera
Monotypic rosid genera
Afromontane flora
Endemic flora of Tanzania
Critically endangered plants
Taxonomy articles created by Polbot